Robert Graham King (born May 24, 1951) is an American macroeconomist. He is currently professor at the Department of Economics at Boston University, editor of the Journal of Monetary Economics, research consultant to the Federal Reserve Bank of Richmond, and a member of the National Bureau of Economic Research.

Before that he was a professor at the University of Rochester and then at the University of Virginia.

King is married to another macroeconomist, Marianne Baxter.

King's work spans many areas, including business cycle theory and measurement, real business cycle theory, monetary policy, and economic growth.

Influential works

See also 
 Journal of Monetary Economics

External links 
 Robert King's web site at Boston University
 The Journal of Monetary Economics

1951 births
Living people
Macroeconomists
Brown University alumni
Boston University faculty
University of Virginia faculty
University of Rochester faculty
Fellows of the Econometric Society
20th-century American economists
21st-century American economists